Expedition Amazon is a 1983 role-playing video game designed by Willard Phillips for the Apple II and published by Penguin Software. The goal of the game is to guide four explorers as they study Incan ruins. There are four classes in the game: Medic, Field Assistant, Radio Operator, and Guard.

Reception
Computer Gaming World criticized its documentation, but called Expedition Amazon "a very enjoyable game that doesn't take itself too seriously" and suggested that it be played with friends.

References

1983 video games
Apple II games
Commodore 64 games
FM-7 games
NEC PC-8801 games
NEC PC-9801 games
Role-playing video games
Video games developed in the United States
Penguin Software games
Video games set in South America